The Oriental Nightfish is a 1978 animated film directed by Ian Emes which accompanies the Linda McCartney composition "The Oriental Nightfish". The film has a running time of 4m 30s and features animation by Ian Emes with the track "The Oriental Nightfish" performed by Wings, the band Linda and her husband Paul McCartney were members of.

Creation 
In 2010, Emes commented:

I got pissed off whisky and put the music on as loud as it would go, and lay on my back in the living room and let it wash over me. The whisky did indeed help, and I came up with this weird idea where alien forces enter this building where someone who looks like Linda McCartney plays a Gothic Expressionistic Wurlitzer. This woman with blonde hair is penetrated, got naked and inhabited by the alien force, then she's replicated, before becoming a comet that explodes. The film was a bit weird, scary and a little bit sexual. Yet it was later put on Paul McCartney's Rupert The Bear video for children. The kids who watched it years ago are now in their 20s, and they've set up an internet site called The Oriental Nightfish Haunted My Childhood. I guess it freaked them out and opened their imagination.

Personnel
Linda McCartney - lead vocals, electric piano, moog synthesizer
Paul McCartney - bass, guitar, drums, mellotron
Denny Laine - flute

Availability
The track "The Oriental Nightfish" was released in 1998 on the studio/compilation album Wide Prairie following Linda McCartney's death earlier that year.

The video for "The Oriental Nightfish" was made available on the VHS release of Rupert and the Frog Song. However, the DVD Tales of Wonder: Music and Animation Classics (2004) (also released as Paul McCartney's Music and Animation Collection) does not contain it.

Sources

External links 
 Emes' page on Oriental Nightfish

1978 films
British animated short films
Paul McCartney
Films directed by Ian Emes
1970s English-language films
1970s British films